Alexander Murray ( – 1 May 1750) was a Scottish politician who sat in the British House of Commons from 1715 to 1727.

Early life and family 

Murray was the second son of Richard Murray of Broughton (a member of the pre-Union Parliament of Scotland) and his wife Anna Lennox, the daughter of Alexander Lennox of Cally.  His brother John Murray  was also a member of Parliament of Scotland.

In 1726 he married Lady Euphemia Stewart, daughter of the 5th Earl of Galloway. They had one son, James
(1727–1799).

Murray inherited extensive estates in Kirkcudbright from his mother. In 1740 he bought Broughton House in High Street, Kirkcudbright as a town house.

Career 
At the 1715 general election, Murray elected as the Member of Parliament (MP) for Kirkcudbright Stewartry. He was re-elected unopposed in 1722, but was defeated at the 1727 election.

References 
 

1680 births
1750 deaths
Year of birth uncertain
Members of the Parliament of Great Britain for Scottish constituencies
British MPs 1715–1722
British MPs 1722–1727
People from the Scottish Borders